Chicago-Style Stepping (also known as Steppin') is an urban dance that originated in Chicago and continues to evolve nationwide and overseas, while defining its unique style and culture. within urban community. "Chicago-Style Stepping" makes reference to other urban styles of dance found throughout the United States in urban enclaves such as Detroit, Cleveland, Baltimore and Washington, D.C.

Origins 
The partner dances that began in Chicago during the big band era came from the east coast Swing dances the Jitter Bug and the Lindy Hop. The Bop emerged in the late 50's and 1960's when dancing at clubs and ballrooms flourished in the City. The Bop was directly influenced by the music of Chess Records and Motown Records. The basic pattern of the Chicago Bop was like most 6 count Swing dances. The Chicago Bop Style was similar to the "Philly Bop" as seen on the American Bandstand television show. The youth of the late 60's in the high schools of Chicago began changing the movement of the partner dance from a circular rotation to a straight line featuring a north and south pattern. During the 60's Chicagoans did not refer to the partner dance as bopping or stepping instead people simply said they were "dancing" however all dancers of that era acknowledged the Chicago Bop as the original dance. The basic characteristics of the Chicago Bop was smooth, cool, less acrobatic and done with one hand.  In 1971 with the release of the JB's song entitled "Gimmie Some More" the younger generation of dancers created another variation of the partner which was called "The New Bop". The NEW BOP is the foundation of what is known as Stepping Today. With music fueled by the JB's, the youth from the streets of Chicago changed the pattern of the partner dance from one hand to 2 hands and the body motion from front to back to side to side.  Years later, in 1974 a DJ/Prompter by the name of Sam Chatman saw a couple dancing and when the two separated Sam announced during the party "it looks like they are "Stepping" and the name Stepping became popular for the partner dance. 
The term Chicago "Bop" was used to describe the dance form by Chicagoans until the early 1970s. Prior to that time "Bop" was a universally known term with its origin beginning sometime between 1945 & 1950 to express music and dance. The dance known as Chicago Stepping' evolved from the New Bop and is more likely a derivative of several east coast swing dances. No published syllabuses exist for the dance. Chicago-Style Stepping is an exclusive local dance and gained a foothold on radio in 1989 when a local radio station, WVAZ (102.7 FM) began playing music on Saturday Night. Prior to commercial radio expressing interest in "Steppers" music a college radio station WKKC FM 89.3 in 1975 began programming with Steppers Music.

Popularity 
Steppin in Chicago goes back to the late 1940s early 1950s, originally called Bopping  it evolved with soul music as the street corner harmony soul songs did with musical bands. Stepping remained popular throughout, even as Hip Hop and Rap music came along it remained mainstream in the urban dance scene. ( Also there's the only Mainstream Steppin TV show in the World ! " Step On IT " urban ballroom show signed to icon rapper ' Skee Lo 's Music Mogul label/Sony for global distribution, Aires on IFAME TV via Roku/Apple TV.)

Artist such as Grover Washington Jr., Michael Jackson, Earth, Wind and Fire, Average White Band and especially James Brown (J.B.'s Mono-rail) all had hot stepping tunes aside from many others

R. Kelly's songs that featured Steppin' or Stepping helped move the dance into national mainstream culture.

Characteristics 
Chicago Stepping is a slotted dance. The follower is typically kept traveling up and down the slot. Two action two one count cycle is the structure. Patterns like "roll out and rollback" describe the action on the slot or lane. The lane belongs to the follower and the leaders travel on, off and around the slot or lane.  Steppin' has a 6 or 8 count basic pattern. Its tempo ranges 70 to 100 bpm. Its basic rhythm pattern consists of a double and two syncopated triples. The patterns start traditionally on the downbeat of one. The leader's footwork is started on their Left and finished on their Right. The follower's dance is naturally opposite. The dance bears similar characteristics to New York Hustle and West Coast Swing.

See also
Footwork (Chicago)
Step dance

References

External links
Kyles, Kyra (2009). "Taking a Step Back", ChicagoTribune.com. Accessed: July 24, 2014.
Let Us Show You How .... Chicago Style Stepping ... Effortless Steps; YouTube

Culture of Chicago
Ballroom dance
African-American music
African-American dance